Cythara coniformis is a species of sea snail, a marine gastropod mollusk in the family Mangeliidae.

This species is considered a nomen dubium.

Description
The length of the shell attains 9 mm.

The thin, whitish shell is rather transparent. It is faintly plicate on the upper part of the whorls and transversely very faintly striated.

Distribution
This marine species occurs off Hawaii

References

External links
  Tucker, J.K. 2004 Catalog of recent and fossil turrids (Mollusca: Gastropoda). Zootaxa 682: 1–1295.

coniformis
Gastropods described in 1839